Withdrawal means "an act of taking out" and may refer to:
 Anchoresis (withdrawal from the world for religious or ethical reasons)
 Coitus interruptus (the withdrawal method)
 Drug withdrawal
 Social withdrawal
 Taking of money from a bank
 Water withdrawal
 Withdrawal (military)
 Withdrawal reflex
 Withdrawal, Twista/Do or Die EP
 "Withdrawals" (Tyler Farr song)

See also